Volvicornis rufescens is a species of beetle in the family Dermestidae, the only species in the genus Volvicornis.

References

Dermestidae